Tetrathemis platyptera, pigmy skimmer, is a species of dragonfly in the family Libellulidae. It is widespread in many Asian countries and locally common over much of its range.

Description and habitat
It is a small dragonfly with yellow face and bluish green eyes. Its thorax and abdomen are yellow with broad black marks. Its wings are transparent, with fore-wings faintly and hind-wings broadly tinted with yellow in base. Females are similar to males.

It breeds in vegetated ponds and wells. Female stabs eggs on dry twigs hanging over water. The eggs hatch out in rains and the larvae fall directly into the water below.

See also 
 List of odonates of Sri Lanka
 List of odonates of India
 List of odonata of Kerala

References

External links

Libellulidae
Insects described in 1878